Newman & Guardia was a British company that manufactured cameras and other  fine instruments including early aircraft instruments.

The company was in existence between 1893 and 1956 and continued into the 196O's with premises in the Templefields Industrial Estate, Edinburgh Way, Harlow, Essex.It was acquired by Debrie Lawley around 1970.

It was a prolific producer of cameras aimed at a knowledgeable and demanding clientele. Although most were hand-held plate cameras, the company also produced some field, roll-film and specialist cameras.

The following is a list of models known to have been produced:
  
 Nydia  (1900)
 Cyclops (manufactured by Nettel)
 Single Lens reflex 
 Folding reflex   
 Long body Reflex camera  
 New ideal Sibyl 
 New Special Sibyl 
 Postcard Sibyl 
 Baby Sibyl
 Sibyl Deluxe  
 Sibyl Excelsior 
 Sibyl imperial Mod. 8 +9  
 Sibyl stereo 
 Sibyl Vitesse  
 Special Sibyl 
 Special stereoscopic roll film Sibyl (custom made) 
 Trellis 
 Universal Twin Lens Pattern 
 Universal Pattern B  
 Universal Special B
 Universal Deluxe
 Stereo Universal camera
 W.1. M.P.H. No. 1805 BW mark IV A – Air speed indicator

References 

Harlow
Manufacturing companies of the United Kingdom
Photography companies of the United Kingdom